Mumblety-peg (also known as mumbley-peg, mumblepeg, mumble-the-peg, mumbledepeg or mumble-de-peg) is an old outdoor game played using pocketknives. The term "mumblety-peg" came from the practice of putting a peg of about 2 or 3 inches into the ground. The loser of the game had to take it out with his teeth.

Mark Twain's book Tom Sawyer, Detective recounts "mumbletypeg" as one of boys' favorite outdoor games.

Overview
Mumblety-peg is generally played between two people, with a pocketknife.

In one common version of the game, two opponents stand opposite one another with their feet shoulder-width apart. The first player then takes the knife and throws it to "stick" in the ground as near his own foot as possible. The second player then repeats the process. Whichever player "sticks" the knife closest to his own foot wins the game.

If a player "sticks" the knife in his own foot, he wins the game by default, although few players find this option appealing because of the possibility of bodily harm. The game combines not only precision in the knife-throwing, but also a good deal of bravado and proper assessment of one's own skills.

Variants

In the most basic version of the game,  one contestant throws a knife end over end as deeply as possible into the ground, after which another player tries to extract it with his or her teeth.

There are many variants of the basic game. One relatively safe version is very similar to H-O-R-S-E basketball. Here, the first player attempts to stick his knife in the ground using some unusual technique, such as behind the back or off his knee. If he is successful, the second player must duplicate the feat. In some cases, just getting the knife to stick at all can be the objective but in others, the players attempt to stick their knives into the peg or as close to it as possible.

In the variant known as "Stretch", the object of the game is to make the other player fall over from having to spread his legs too far apart. The players begin facing each other some distance apart with their own heels and toes touching, and take turns attempting to stick their knives in the ground outboard of the other player's feet.  If the knife sticks, the other player must move his foot out to where the knife stuck while keeping the other foot in place, provided the distance between foot and knife is about twelve inches or less.  Play continues until one player falls or is unable to make the required stretch.

The highly dangerous "Chicken" variant is the opposite of "Stretch". Here, one player bets the other how many sticks he will allow the other to make between his feet. The betting player then stands with his feet as far apart as possible and the other player throws his knife into the gap between them. If the knife sticks, the betting player moves whichever foot is closer to the knife to where the knife stuck. Therefore, hitting as close to the center as possible is desirable to make the opponent's feet come close to each other with the fewest throws. The process repeats until either the agreed-upon number of sticks has been accomplished (betting player wins), either player refuses to go any further (whichever player did not "chicken out" wins), or the knife hits the betting player (betting player wins). Approximately halving the distance between the feet at each stick, five sticks is essentially the upper limit that still leaves the feet very slightly apart, so such bets are rarely made or taken.

Sometimes the throw varies starting with the knife's tip on a player's body part (elbow, wrist, shoulder, etc.). The knife's handle is pushed so it rotates end over end so the blade sticks into the ground.  This version of the game is shown in part one of the television miniseries "Lonesome Dove" between the characters Deets, Newt and Pea Eye approximately 30 minutes into the program. If one player succeeds, that player will then decide on the next "trick". The other player is sometimes given more than one try.  The game repeats until one player cannot duplicate the "trick".  If there are multiple players then play continues to "knock out" a player until only one player remains.

See also
 Bloody knuckles
 Knife game

References

External links
How To Play Mumbly Peg
Of Pocketknives and Mumbledy-Peg by John Rezelman
'Not Too Sharp' - Delaware Today by Shaun Gallagher
Dialect Survey Results: Mumblety-peg List naming variations for the game.
"Pocket Knife Games Were Popular Pastimes" by Glenn Tunney described a game called “Pocket Knife Baseball”

Children's games
Games of physical skill
Knives
Boys' toys and games